Pseudo-Alexios II was the most famous among several pretenders to the throne of the Byzantine Empire who appeared in the early reign of Isaac II Angelos (r. 1185-1195 and 1203–1204). He claimed to be the Emperor Alexios II Komnenos, who had been murdered in 1183.

Career of the false Alexios II 

Pseudo-Alexios II was a young man from Constantinople, whose resemblance to the deceased emperor and his father Manuel I Komnenos convinced many of the veracity of his claims. He visited Iconium and sought an audience with Sultan Kilij Arslan II. The sultan, struck by the resemblance to Manuel, allowed him to enroll troops, but he refused to break the treaty he had concluded with Isaac II, and thus lose the tribute he was receiving from the Byzantine Empire.

The pretender assembled an army of 8,000 men and ravaged the valley of the Maeander River, storming several cities, including the rich city of Chonae in order to appease his troops with plunder. Isaac sent his brother Alexios to deal with the pretender, but the imperial troops had very little success.

The false Alexios' career came to a sudden stop when he was assassinated by a priest, who was infuriated with Alexios' alliance with the Muslim Turks, his permission for them to plunder the richest cities in Asia Minor, and his tolerance of the desecration of the churches in these cities that the Turks committed. The assassin carried the head of the pretender to the sebastocrator Alexios, who was so taken aback by the similarities of its features to those of Manuel I, that he exclaimed "Those who followed him may be innocent after all."

Other pretenders 

After the death of Pseudo-Alexios, several others also assumed the name of Alexios II. One was taken in Paphlagonia and put to death. Another rose up at Nicomedia in 1195/1196, but he was captured and blinded.

References 

 George Finlay, History of the Byzantine and Greek Empires from 1057 - 1453, Volume 2, William Blackwood & Sons, 1854
 

12th-century Byzantine people
Byzantine pretenders
Impostor pretenders
12th-century monarchs in Europe
12th-century monarchs in the Middle East